Rooth is a surname.

The Rooth family crest is characterized by a deer lying underneath a tree.

Notable people with the surname include:

Andrea Rooth (born 2002), Norwegian hurdler
Gösta Rooth (1918–2008), Swedish physician
Ivar Rooth (1888–1972), Swedish lawyer and economist
James Augustus Rooth (1868–1963), British Royal Army Medical Corps officer
Maria Rooth (born 1979), Swedish ice hockey player
Robert Rooth, American lawyer